Paopi 13 - Coptic Calendar - Paopi 15

The fourteenth day of the Coptic month of Paopi, the second month of the Coptic year. On a common year, this day corresponds to October 11, of the Julian Calendar, and October 24, of the Gregorian Calendar. This day falls in the Coptic season of Peret, the season of emergence.

Commemorations

Saints 

 The departure of Saint Phillip, one of the Seven Deacons

References 

Days of the Coptic calendar